This is a list of tallest buildings in Hamburg. As in most German cities except Frankfurt, skyscrapers or high-rises in Hamburg are rarely approved or built.

Tallest buildings and structures 

The few high-rises in Hamburg are mostly clustered at St. Georg's Berliner Tor Center, St. Pauli's Hafenkrone, and most likely in future also at HafenCity's Elbbrücken.

Tallest buildings and structures under construction, announced or proposed

See also 
 List of tallest buildings in Germany 
 List of tallest buildings in Frankfurt

References

External links 

 Hamburg at SkyscraperPage
 Hamburg at Emporis

!
Tallest buildings
Hamburg